Moor Island, formerly Moore Island, is one of the uninhabited Arctic Archipelago islands in Kivalliq Region, Nunavut, Canada. It is one of the several islands located in Chesterfield Inlet.

References

Islands of Chesterfield Inlet
Uninhabited islands of Kivalliq Region